Ian Redpath (born 12 September 1965) is a former English first-class cricketer, who had a brief county career with Essex and Derbyshire in the late 1980s. He did not have anything like the success of his Australian namesake, and never made a serious impression on the game.

At Second XI level Redpath was sometimes considerably more effective. In May 1985, playing for Essex seconds against Kent II in the Second Eleven Championship, he scored 118 not out, sharing in an unbroken stand of 374 for the second wicket

with Alan Lilley (224*).

Notes

External links
Statistical summary from CricketArchive
Lists of matches and detailed statistics for Ian Redpath from CricketArchive

English cricketers
Derbyshire cricketers
Essex cricketers
1965 births
Living people